Olla is a town in northwest La Salle Parish, Louisiana, United States, located in the heart of the Louisiana Central Hill Country.

Olla has a federally recognized downtown Historic District and a Louisiana historic marker. The population was 1,385 at the 2010 census. Olla Historic District is the site of the annual Central Louisiana Bluegrass Festival each April and to the Olla Homecoming Parade, Celebration, and Festival that coincides with LaSalle High School Homecoming each autumn.

The Town of Olla also hosts an annual nighttime Christmas Parade, Miss Merry Christmas Pageant, and Community Christmas. These events occur on the Friday locals schools release for Christmas break. The parade begins at the Olla Elementary School and terminates at Santa's Gazebo in the Olla Town Square. The Olla Town Square in located within the Olla Historic District and contains the Olla Farmers Market/Community Pavilion (completed in 2014), Wishing Tree, Dixie Center(Community Center), Gazebo, historic marker, and a stage. The Olla Wishing Tree, which stands between the Community Pavilion and stage, is part of local lore as it's said to "grant wishes" to those who close their eyes and touch its bark. The Olla Town Square facilities can be rented by the public for events.

The "Tri-City Popper" fireworks show, an endeavor funded by donations from the Towns and businesses of Olla, Tullos, and Urania, is held at dusk each 4 July at the Historic Olla Fairgrounds. This event is conducted by the Olla Volunteer Fire Department

 The town's motto is "Small Town, Big Heart" in reference to the hospitality and generosity of its citizens.
 The Town of Olla has two large parks with a paved walking trail, multiple baseball fields, public swimming pool, bowling alley, and a Recreation Center that is facilitated by the YMCA.

History

The Town of Olla is the oldest incorporated town in LaSalle Parish. Settled prior to the American Civil War, the town of Olla was known as Castor Sulfur Springs, and a steamboat port on nearby Bayou Castor was its original site. The area had a post office, general store, hotel, spa, and a dry goods and cotton storage facility.

Naturally-occurring sulfur muds and spring water made Castor Sulfur Springs a nationally known "health spa".

In 1890, the Olla Military Institute, a private military school was established. The first faculty members consisted of Riley J. Wilson, Ms. Olla Mills, John Paul Jones, Missy Robertson, Rev. Elijah Bryant, and Bell Murphy. The school flourished for several years until 1899, when a fire destroyed the campus. At this time, a public school, Olla High School, was constructed to serve the towns of Olla and Standard. In 1950, Olla, Urania, and Tullos High Schools closed, and consolidated as LaSalle High School. The Olla Elementary School now sits at the former site of the Olla Military Institute and Olla High School.

In 1891, the Houston, Central Arkansas, and Northern Railroad came to what was then northwest Catahoula Parish and bought a 200-foot-wide right-of-way over which it would construct a railroad more than a mile away from Castor Sulfur Springs. Community leaders were faced with the possibility that their town would be cut off and decided that a railroad station must be constructed for passenger and commercial services to ensure the survival of Castor Sulfur Springs. Dr. Frank Mills, with the assistance of Mr. J.D. Adams, set aside 40 acres of land for a station and town-site. This transaction was recorded on February 9, 1891. When the new site was chosen and incorporation paperwork was submitted naming the new community “New Castor Sulfur Springs”, their request was denied.

The legislature was not accepting new municipalities named in reference to springs, rivers, bayous, or creeks to avoid duplication and confusion. New Lebanon was considered as well as many Greek and Biblical names, which were very popular at the time. After much debate, it was decided that the relocated community should be named for Olla Mills, daughter of Dr. Frank Mills and sister of Judge W.H. Mills, who were residents of Castor Sulfur Springs for many years. Ms. Mills was an accomplished, attractive, and popular young lady who was dramatically inclined and took part in all constructive community activities, who served with distinction as the head of the Olla Military Institute's English department. Miss Olla Mills, who later became Mrs. CC Young, died in 1901 and is buried in the Olla Cemetery.

The Town of Olla was officially incorporated on August 1, 1899, with Dr. William V. Taylor III as its first mayor. In 1906, the Zeagler Family established and erected the Olla State Bank as the cornerstone of the downtown. Built in Romanesque Revival style, the bank's structure is said to be influenced by Louisiana native and architect Henry Hobson Richardson. The Olla State Bank served Olla and the surrounding region throughout the Great Depression until its merger with Southern Heritage Bank in 1980s. The Ernest Gray Gang as well as The Jimmy Yarrell Gang held up the bank in the 1930s.

Olla is also the location of the only train holdup in Louisiana history. In August 1900, unknown bandits built a fire on the tracks north of Olla and forced the train to stop. The group then boarded and ordered the conductor to disconnect the mail and express cars from the train. The express safe was cracked, but the expected big money shipment from St. Louis, Missouri to New Orleans was not aboard. The robbers got away with less than $50.

Near the site of the former Olla Military Institute, B.E. Zeagler of Olla and L.C. Nunn of Columbia, Louisiana organized and constructed the North Central Louisiana Fair or Carnival fair barns, and an equine racetrack stadium in 1912. Since its inception, the open space has served the parishes of La Salle, Winn, Grant, and Caldwell, and it is now called the Olla Fairgrounds. Still host to an annual event every fall, it is one of the oldest continuously running fairs or carnivals in the United States. The fairgrounds also contains a modern rodeo arena that hosts the Olla Rodeo, sponsored by the local Kiwanis International club, annually.

In 1910, the state of Louisiana split Catahoula Parish in half. The western half where the Town of Olla is situated became La Salle Parish, named for French explorer René-Robert Cavelier, Sieur de La Salle. An immediate struggle developed between the towns of Olla and Jena over the location of the parish courthouse. Jena was subsequently chosen as the La Salle parish seat because of its central location. Even without the prestige of being the parish seat, the early 20th century brought many changes to the Town of Olla. Olla's economy grew with the success of two large sawmills in the area – Urania Lumber Company to the south and Louisiana Central Lumber Company located to the north, in Standard. Mr. G.W. McCartney purchased a dynamo to bring electric lights to Olla. Residences were also piped with natural gas. The town took another step forward when Mr. Sam Shamblin opened a silent movie house. The Community Talking Picture Company of Shreveport sold Olla its first talking movies, and later a more modern theater was erected.

Known for its excellent ground water, Olla was the site of the Olla Bottling Works. During the 1920s and 1930s, the Olla Bottling Works made and distributed numerous flavored carbonated beverages including NuGrape Soda. The Olla Bottling Works was purchased by a firm in Monroe and eventually merged with the Coca-Cola Bottling Company.

The Southern Baptist encampment and the Civilian Conservation Corps Camp activities also left their mark on Olla. Each year Baptist campers gathered for two weeks of religious instruction, preaching, and recreation. The CCC Camp occupied the same facilities the remainder of the year, and the area is still crossed with public and private roads built by the CCC. Olla is also the site of Camp Olla, an annual Pentecostal summer camp, retreat, and hurricane evacuation shelter.

In 1938, oil was discovered just outside Olla's boundaries. This was a tremendous boost for the local economy because the large sawmills had begun to slow production. The Olla Oil Field brought a fresh influx of people and is large producer of light sweet crude and natural gas.

The Town of Olla currently serves as a regional hub for banking, commercial retail, and manufacturing and is heavily involved with the forestry and petroleum production industries.

Downtown Olla is a recognized Historic District with many buildings being restored for commercial use.

On November 23, 2004, a tornado that reached F3 strength tore through parts of the town, destroying or damaging a large portion of the buildings, including LaSalle High School. Classes were held in an abandoned sportswear factory, known as Holloway Sportswear, until a new high school was constructed. In 2005, the town played host to many evacuees from Hurricanes Katrina and Rita.

Geography
Olla is located within the Louisiana Central Hill County, the upland hill areas between the Red and Ouachita River valleys, at  (31.899443, -92.234774).

According to the United States Census Bureau, the town has a total area of 5.4 square miles (12.9 km), all land. It is situated exactly halfway (47 miles) (76 km), between Monroe to the north and Alexandria to the south. Also to the south, the towns of Urania and Tullos lie four and seven miles, respectively. The town of Jena is 16 miles (26 km) to the southeast. Surrounded by pine and deciduous forests, nature's abundance and beauty of the area have been a draw for hunters, nature lovers, and tourists.

The town of Olla is served by the Union Pacific Railroad, and U.S. Route 165 traverses north and south. Nearby U.S. Route 84 and a number of state roads serve as east and west corridors.

Demographics 

As of the census of 2010, there were 1,617 people, 587 households, and 407 families residing in the town. The racial makeup of the town was 95.06% White, 2.46% African American, 1.35% Native American, 0.42% Asian, 0.21% from other races, and 0.49% from two or more races. Hispanic or Latino of any race were 1.20% of the population.

There were 587 households, of which 32.2% had children under the age of 18 living with them, 55.5% were married couples living together, 11.4% had a female householder with no husband present, and 30.5% were non-families. 27.9% of all households were made up of individuals, and 15.2% had someone living alone who was 65 years of age or older. The average household size was 2.41 and the average family size was 2.95.

In the town, the population was spread out, with 26.1% under the age of 18, 8.5% from 18 to 24, 28.9% from 25 to 44, 21.3% from 45 to 64, and 15.2% who were 65 years of age or older. The median age was 36 years. For every 100 females, there were 87.9 males. For every 100 females age 18 and over, there were 85.3 males.

The incorporated Towns of Olla, Urania, Tullos, and Georgetown, unincorporated Northern LaSalle, Southern Caldwell, Northern Grant, and Eastern Winn Parishes are considered the Olla Market Area or Olla Region.

Education
The following schools operated by the La Salle Parish School Board serve the city:
 Olla-Standard Elementary School (Olla)
 La Salle Junior High School (Urania, Louisiana)
 La Salle High School (Olla)

Notable people
 Thomas "Bud" Brady, member of the Louisiana House of Representatives from 1976 to 1988, resided in Olla
 John Cooksey, Monroe ophthalmologist and former congressman, Louisiana's 5th congressional district, graduated from LaSalle High School
 Kristy Curry, head coach of Alabama Crimson Tide women's basketball
 Ronald Jackson Hays, admiral, United States Navy, United States Naval Academy
 Herman Johnson, New York Giants offensive guard
 Gene Jones, film and television actor
 Billy Masters, Denver Broncos tight end
 J. Reed Walters, LaSalle Parish district attorney
 Alfred (Al) Busby, born 1928-(92) town resident, former businessman, renowned transmission mechanic, ref. Al Busby day at town hall

References

External links

 http://www.townofolla.com Town of Olla

Towns in Louisiana
Towns in LaSalle Parish, Louisiana